An end-stopped line is a feature in poetry in which the syntactic unit (phrase, clause, or sentence) corresponds in length to the line. Its opposite is enjambment, where the sentence runs on into the next line.  According to A. C. Bradley, "a line may be called 'end-stopped' when the sense, as well as the metre, would naturally make one pause at its close; 'run-on' when the mere sense would lead one to pass to the next line without any pause."

An example of end-stopping can be found in the following extract from The Burning Babe by Robert Southwell; the end of each line corresponds to the end of a clause.
As I in hoary winter's night stood shivering in the snow, 
Surprised I was with sudden heat, which made my heart to glow; 
And lifting up a fearful eye to view what fire was near, 
A pretty babe all burning bright did in the air appear.

The following extract from The Winter's Tale by Shakespeare is heavily enjambed.

I am not prone to weeping, as our sex
Commonly are; the want of which vain dew 
Perchance shall dry your pities; but I have 
That honourable grief lodged here which burns
Worse than tears drown. 

In this extract from The Gap by Sheldon Vanauken, the first and third lines are enjambed while the second and fourth are end-stopped:

All else is off the point: the Flood, the Day 
Of Eden, or the Virgin Birth—Have done! 
The Question is, did God send us the Son
Incarnate crying Love! Love is the Way!

Scholars such as Bradley and Goswin König have estimated approximate dates of undated works of Shakespeare by studying the proportion of end-stopping to enjambment, the former being more typical of Shakespeare's early plays, the latter a feature of his later plays.

See also
 enjambment

Poetic rhythm
Poetic devices